Manang District (a part of Gandaki Province, is one of the seventy-seven districts of Nepal.

The pass of Thorung La at 5415 meters above the sea connects the district to Mustang District by providing a route between the towns of Manang and Muktinath. Manang district gets least amount of rainfall among districts of Nepal as it lies to the north of the Himalayas which blocks monsoon air. The Manang Valley, which lies close to the Nepal-Tibet border, offers tremendous opportunities due to its rich natural flora and fauna. Three tracks start from here. The first, via Thorangla, Muktinath, and Mustang to Lhasa—a journey that takes four days; the second via Naur Khola and Naurgaon, which takes five days to Lhasa; and finally the third via Larkiya bazar, which is the one most commonly used by the people of Central Nepal.

Along with the Marwaris who have migrated from India to Nepal in large numbers, the Manangies are the best known traders of Nepal. They have received special dispensation from the King to trade in South East Asia, and travel abroad with precious stones and metals, musk, herbs and other items. They import ready-made garments, watches and electronic goods. Many of the Manangies spend as much as six months away from home, returning only during the summers. Many of them reside in Kathmandu, where their children study in the English medium schools. The parents' lack of proficiency in the English language is irrelevant as it in no way affects their trading skills.

Since the area was opened to outsiders in the late 1970s, many have switched from the traditional agriculture to hoteleering.

The trail from Manang to Muktinath has been used by the locals for hundreds of years to transport huge herds of sheep and yak in and out of Manang. It is an important route for the people of the region.

The northern parts of Manang Valley are dry, brown and desolate places, very different from the thick forests and brown green valleys of Sikkim and Eastern Nepal.

Geography and climate

Demographics
At the time of the 2011 Nepal census, Manang District had a population of 6,538. Of these, 62.3% spoke Gurung, 16.2% Nepali, 8.1% Tamang, 7.4% Sherpa, 1.2% Magar, 0.9% Newari, 0.9% Thakali, 0.4% Kham, 0.3% Sign language, 0.2% Bhojpuri, 0.2% Bote, 0.2% Rai and 1.6% other languages as their first language.

In terms of ethnicity/caste, 57.1% were Gurung, 12.6% Tamang, 7.1% Ghale, 6.9% Bhote, 3.8% Kami, 2.5% Hill Brahmin, 2.3% Magar, 1.5% Chhetri, 1.5% Newar, 0.9% Damai/Dholi, 0.9% Thakali, 0.5% Rai, 0.3% Sherpa, 0.2% Bote, 0.2% Sarki and 1.6% others.

In terms of religion, 55.2% were Buddhist, 39.2% Hindu, 1.4% Christian, 0.5% Bon, 0.2% Prakriti, 0.1% Muslim and 3.4% others.

In terms of literacy, 72.0% could read and write, 0.7% could only read and 27.3% could neither read nor write.

Administration
The district consists of four rural municipalities. These are as follows:
Chame
Nason Rural Municipality
Narpa Bhumi Rural Municipality
Manang Ngisyang Rural Municipality

Former Municipalities and Village Development Committees 
Prior to the restructuring of the district, Manang District consisted of the following municipalities and Village development committees:
Bhakra
Chame
Dharapani
Ghyaru
Khangsar
Manang
Nar
Ngawal
Phu
Pisang
Tachi Bagarchhap
Tanki Manang
Thoche

See also
Zones of Nepal (Former)

References

External links 

Districts in Nepal: their Websites, Official Facebook Page & ICT
 

 
Gandaki Province
Districts of Nepal established in 1962